100th Anniversary (Gümüşkum) Nature Park is a coastal nature park in Mersin, Turkey.

In 1977, the grove at the Mediterranean Sea side was declared a recreation area. On November 7, 2011, the area was declared a nature park by the Ministry of Environment and Forest. However the ministry decided to end its status as a nature park and there is a heated discussion on its future status 

"Gümüşkum" means literally "Silver sand". The nature park offers outdoor recreational activities for visitors on a daily basis such as hiking, swimming and picnicing. Camping and renting of cottages or bungalows are also available.

The trees in the park are Turkish pine (Pinus brutia) and eucalyptus. The endemic plant sea daffodil (Pancratium maritimum) is endangered. A section of the sandy beach in the nature park is used by green sea turtles (Chelonia mydas) and loggerhead sea turtles (Caretta caretta) for ovulation. A treatment and rehabilitation center for the sea turtles is situated inside the nature park.

The status of the protected area as "nature park" was revoked on July 14, 2015. It was decided to decrease its status to "recreation area of grade A". Upon protests of the residents of Mersin to protect and conserve the sea turtles, the Ministry cancelled its decision within about one month, and the status of the protected area remained unchanged.

References

Nature parks in Turkey
Beaches of Turkey
2011 establishments in Turkey
Protected areas established in 2011
Wildlife sanctuaries of Turkey
Mezitli District
Parks in Mersin Province